The 2022–23 Basketbol Süper Ligi is the 57th season of the Basketball Super League (Turkish: Basketbol Süper Ligi), the top-level professional club men's basketball league in Turkey.

Teams
On 2 May 2022, Manisa BB was promoted to the BSL as the champion of the Turkish Basketball First League. It will be their first season in the BSL. Beysu Konyaspor promoted to the BSL as winners of the TBL play-offs.

Semt77 Yalovaspor and HDI Sigorta Afyon Belediye were relegated after finishing in the last two spots for 2021–22 Basketbol Süper Ligi.

Venues

Personnel and sponsorship

Head coaching changes

Regular season

League table

Positions by round

Results

Statistical leaders

| width=50% valign=top |

Points

|}

|}

| width=50% valign=top |

Assists

|}

|}
Source: Basketbol Süper Ligi

Awards
All official awards of the 2022–23 Basketbol Süper Ligi.

MVP of the Round

Turkish clubs in European competitions

References

External links
Official Site
TBLStat.net Historical Data

Turkish Basketball Super League seasons
Turkish
1
Turkey